Syagrus sancona is a species of palm tree found in Brazil, Bolivia, Venezuela, Colombia, Ecuador and Peru.

References

sancona
Trees of Peru
Trees of Colombia
Trees of Ecuador
Trees of Brazil